The 2017 Caerphilly County Borough Council election was held on 4 May 2017 as part of the national 2017 Welsh local elections. The election was preceded by the 2012 CCBC election and will be followed by the 2022 CCBC election.

Overall results 
Plaid Cymru had achieved tremendous growth in the 1999 Caerphilly County Borough Council election gaining a total of 38 seats, This tremendous growth had declined by the 2012 election to just 20 seats. The Independents in Caerphilly County Borough had also suffered sizable losses in the 2012 election going from 9 in 2008 election to 3 in 2012 election. 

The Labour Party won 50 seats achieving a majority, Plaid Cymru obtained 18 seats and 5 seats were won by independent candidates. One seat (Twyn Carno ward) was elected unopposed.

| colspan="2" | Total
| align=right | 73 
| align=right | 
| align=right | 
| align=right | 
| align=right | 100%
| align=right | 100%
| align=right | 0
| align=right |

Ward results

Cwm Aber / Aber Valley

Aberbargod / Aberbargoed

Abercarn

Argoed

Bargod / Bargoed

Bedwas, Trethomas and Machen

Coed Duon / Blackwood

Cefn Fforest

Crosskeys

Crymlyn / Crumlin

Cwm Darran / Darren Valley

Gilfach

Hengoed

Llanbradach

Maesycwmmer

Morgan Jones

Moria / Moriah

Nelson

Tredegar Newydd / New Tredegar

Trecelyn / Newbridge

Pengam

Penmaen

Penyrheol

Pontllanfraith

Pontlotyn / Pontlottyn

Dwyrain Rhisga / Risca East

Gorllewin Rhisga / Risca West

Catwg Sant / St. Cattwg

Sant Iago / St. James

Martin Sant / St. Martins

Twyn Carno

Ynysddu

Ystrad Mynach

References

2017
2017 Welsh local elections